Haig Club may refer to:

 Haig (whisky)
The Haig, a jazz club in Los Angeles